Coenraad Liebrecht (Coen) Temminck Groll (March 1, 1925 in Amsterdam – February 14, 2015 in Driebergen) was a Dutch architect, architectural historian, professor, and conservator.

Temminck Groll earned his doctorate in 1963 with a thesis on medieval stone houses in Utrecht. From 1973 to 1986 he was Professor of Architecture and Restoration at the Delft University of Technology. He photographed and wrote about the architectural heritage of the Netherlands and of Dutch overseas territories in Asia, the Americas and Africa. He helped restore several churches in Utrecht.

Temminck Groll was buried in the family grave at cemetery  in Amsterdam.

References

Bibliography
Medieval stone houses in Utrecht and their relationship with other northwestern European cities, The Hague 1963, Martinus Nijhoff (thesis).
The architecture of Suriname: 1667-1930 (et al.), Zutphen, 1973, the Walburg Press.
Dutch Overseas. Architectural survey. Mutual heritage of four centuries in three continents  (et al.), Zwolle 2002, Waanders.

External links

 Collectie Temminck Groll National Cultural Heritage (The Netherlands)
 WorldCat catalog

1925 births
2015 deaths
20th-century Dutch architects